Strictispira redferni is a species of small sea snail, a marine gastropod mollusk in the family Pseudomelatomidae.

Description
The length of the shell attains 14.1 mm, its diameter 4.6 mm.

Distribution
S. redferni can be found in Caribbean waters, ranging from the Bahamas to Jamaica; also off French Guiana.

References

External links
 Tippett D.L. (2006). The genus Strictispira in the western Atlantic (Gastropoda: Conoidea). Malacologia. 48(1–2): 43–64.
 Rosenberg, G.; Moretzsohn, F.; García, E. F. (2009). Gastropoda (Mollusca) of the Gulf of Mexico, Pp. 579–699 in: Felder, D.L. and D.K. Camp (eds.), Gulf of Mexico–Origins, Waters, and Biota. Texas A&M Press, College Station, Texas

redferni
Gastropods described in 2006